Pahangone is a genus of dwarf spiders containing the single species, Pahangone mirabilis. It was  first described by A. V. Tanasevitch in 2018, and is only found in Malaysia.

References

External links

Linyphiidae
Monotypic Araneomorphae genera